The Souther Hillman Furay Band (SHF) was a country rock supergroup led by singer-songwriters Richie Furay (Buffalo Springfield, Poco), Chris Hillman (The Byrds, The Flying Burrito Brothers, Manassas), and J. D. Souther (Longbranch Pennywhistle, noted songwriter for Linda Ronstadt and the Eagles). The band recorded two albums during the mid-1970s before breaking up due to disagreements and personality conflicts between the members.

History
The band was formed in 1973 at the suggestion of David Geffen, then head of Asylum Records.  Hillman brought three other former members of Manassas to the group: keyboardist/flutist Paul Harris, percussionist Joe Lala, both of whom had also worked with Barnstorm; and pedal steel guitarist Al Perkins, who had also played with the Flying Burrito Brothers. The septet was rounded out by Jim Gordon, a noted session drummer and former member of Derek and the Dominos and Traffic.

The band had a substantial hit in 1974 with its self-titled first album, which was certified gold, and the single "Fallin' in Love" (US #27).  However, during the recording of that album, and influenced by Perkins, Furay converted to evangelical Christianity.  Tensions among the members increased, and Gordon, who may have been experiencing the onset of schizophrenia, left the band and was replaced by Ron Grinel.   In the midst of this chaos, SHF's 1975 album Trouble in Paradise was not critically well received.  Soon after, the group disbanded and its namesake members continued on their solo careers.

Discography

Albums
The Souther-Hillman-Furay Band (Asylum Records, 1974) US #11, Gold, AUS #58
Trouble in Paradise (Originally on Asylum Records now available on Line Records, 1975) US #39, AUS #100

Singles
"Fallin' in Love" (1974) (Asylum) (US Billboard #27)
"Safe at Home" / "Border Town" (1974) (US Cash Box #80)
"For Someone I Love" / "Move Me Real Slow" (1975)
"Mexico" / "Move Me Real Slow" (1975)
"Trouble In Paradise" (1975)

Members
J.D. Souther - vocals, guitar, drums
Chris Hillman - vocals, bass, mandolin
Richie Furay - vocals, guitar
Paul Harris - keyboards, flute
Al Perkins - guitar, pedal steel, dobro
Joe Lala - percussion
Jim Gordon - drums (1973–74)
Ron Grinel - drums (1975–76)

Notes

References
[ Souther Hillman Furay Band] at Allmusic.com

American supergroups
American country rock groups
Musical groups established in 1973